Valeyev or Valeev (Cyrillic: Валеев) is a Tatar masculine surname closely related to Valiyev, its feminine counterpart is Valeyeva or Valeeva. Notable people with the surname include:
Ernest Valeev (born 1950), Russian politician
Ildar Valeyev (born 1991), Russian ice hockey defenceman
Igor Valeev (born 1981), Russian ice hockey player
Natalia Valeeva (born 1969), Italian archer 
Ramil Valeyev (born 1973), Russian footballer and manager
Rinar Valeyev (born 1987), Ukrainian footballer
Ruslan Valeyev (born 1981), Ukrainian footballer
Zilya Valeeva (born 1952), Russian Tatar politician 
Zukhra Valeeva (born 1947), Russian master builder

Tatar-language surnames